I've Got a Woman is an album by organist Jimmy McGriff recorded and released by Sue Records in 1962.

Reception 

The Allmusic review by Michael Erlewine stated "McGriff's first album is great ... Hi-impact early McGriff is the still the best, and this is the album that started it all".

Track listing 
All compositions by Jimmy McGriff except where noted
 "I've Got a Woman" (Ray Charles) – 4:34
 "On the Street Where You Live" (Frederick Loewe, Alan Jay Lerner) – 3:54
 "Satin Doll" (Duke Ellington) – 2:20
 "'Round Midnight" (Thelonious Monk) – 5:43
 "All About My Girl" – 3:54
 "M.G. Blues" – 4:56
 "Thats The Way I Feel" – 2:17
 "After Hours" (Avery Parrish) – 6:02
 "Flying Home" (Lionel Hampton) – 4:00
 "Sermon" (Jimmy Smith) – 5:08

Personnel 
Jimmy McGriff – organ
Morris Dow – guitar
Jackie Mills – drums

References 

1962 albums
Jimmy McGriff albums
Sue Records albums